Johan Brunström and Jean-Julien Rojer were the defending champions, but Rojer chose not to compete this year.Brunstrom partnered up with Mischa Zverev, but they lost in the first round against Pablo Santos and Ivan Sergeyev. Leonardo Tavares and Simone Vagnozzi won the final against Igor Kunitsyn and Yuri Schukin 7–5, 7–6(4).

Seeds

Main draw

Draw

References
Main Draw

Nord LB Open - Doubles
Sport in Lower Saxony
2010 Doubles